Plaesiorrhina plana is a beetle belonging to the family Scarabaeidae.

Description
The basic colour is dark green, with a transversal orange marking on the elytra.

Distribution
This species can be found in the Southern Africa.

References

plana
Beetles described in 1821